Jelovo is a settlement in the Municipality of Radeče in eastern Slovenia. It is dispersed in the hills northwest of Radeče in the historical region of Lower Carniola. The municipality is now included in the Lower Sava Statistical Region; until January 2014 it was part of the Savinja Statistical Region. 

The local church is dedicated to the Three Kings and belongs to the Parish of Radeče. It dates to around 1520.

References

External links
Jelovo at Geopedia

Populated places in the Municipality of Radeče